Desmia natalialis is a moth in the family Crambidae. It was described by Schaus in 1920. It is found in Guatemala.

References

Moths described in 1920
Desmia
Moths of Central America